Victoria is located on the Atlantic coast of Guyana,  east of Georgetown and bordered by Cove and John to the west and Belfield to the east. It was the first village in Guyana to be bought by the combined resources of Africans who had recently won their freedom from slavery.

History
The community was initially established as a plantation called Fort Wellington. In November 1839, 83 ex-slaves from five nearby estates (Douchfour, Ann's Grove, Hope, Paradise and Enmore) pooled their resources and bought Plantation Northbrook for 30,000 guilders, or $10,283.63. Each of the 83 owned one lot of land. After its purchase it was renamed Victoria, presumably in honor of England's Queen Victoria, although some suggest it may have been named as such in honor of the freed slaves' victory.

It is credited with one of the first codes of local government in Guyana, established in 1845. The village grew up to become one of the leading exporters of products made from coconuts and cassava.

The first church built there, a Congregationalist church, named after William Wilberforce, the abolitionist, was erected in 1845. A memorial tablet was placed in the church honoring William Africa Baptiste, known as 'Boss Africa', who became accepted as the Father of the village. Baptiste, who died in 1881, was the first village schoolmaster. Wilberforce Congregational Church at Victoria still stands today.

Pioneering Guyanese playwright, Bertram Charles was born in Victoria and in 1963, organized a series of Creole Breakfasts in order to stimulate artistic and cultural life in the area. .

William Nicholas Arno's History of Victoria Village gives an account of the origins and development of the village.

Notes
 Guyana Jottings
 The Village Movement Chapter 54
 Article from Guyana Tribune, reprinted at Land of Six Peoples

References

Populated places in Demerara-Mahaica
History of Guyana